Return to Home Gori is a 1996 comedy film directed by Alessandro Benvenuti. It is the sequel of Welcome to Home Gori.

Plot
After 5 years from the fateful day of Christmas at Welcome to Home Gori, the scenery changes during a robbery in a villa in Tuscany by Danilo (Massimo Ceccherini) and his friends addicts (one of whom is played by Alessandro Paci). Back home, he expect a sad circumstance, the death of his mother Adele (Ilaria Occhini). In fear of theft Danilo hiding the loot in the coffin of his mother exposed in the red room in the house for the wake.

Cast
Alessandro Benvenuti as Luciano
Massimo Ceccherini as Danilo Gori
Ilaria Occhini as Adele Papini
Carlo Monni as Gino Gori
Novello Novelli as Annibale Papini
Athina Cenci as Bruna Papini
Alessandro Haber as Libero Salvini
Sabrina Ferilli as Sandra Salvini Sottili
Barbara Enrichi as Cinzia Enrichi

References

External links

1996 comedy films
1996 films
Films directed by Alessandro Benvenuti
Italian comedy films
1990s Italian-language films
1990s Italian films